Burnt Sienna is the second studio album by Azalia Snail, released in 1992 by Funky Mushroom.

Track listing

Personnel 
Adapted from Burnt Sienna liner notes.
 Azalia Snail – lead vocals, guitar, harmonica, kalimba, percussion, production
Musicians
 Mike Burns – percussion, production, guitar (1, 7)
 Ray D'Africo – guitar (2, 13)
 Andy Nelson – kalimba, percussion
 Dan Oxenberg – guitar (8, 10)

Release history

References

External links 
 

1992 albums
Azalia Snail albums